Dwayne Rudd (born February 3, 1976) is a retired American football linebacker who played in the National Football League. During his career he played for the Minnesota Vikings, the Cleveland Browns and the Tampa Bay Buccaneers. Rudd was a teammate of Pittsburgh Steelers cornerback Deshea Townsend in both high school and college, at South Panola High School and the University of Alabama, respectively. Derek Pegues, a South Panola alum and an All-SEC Defensive Back for Mississippi State, is his cousin.

Celebration penalties 

In the 2002 season opener between the Browns and the Kansas City Chiefs, the Browns were clinging to a 39–37 lead with 4 seconds left. As Chiefs quarterback Trent Green dropped back to pass, the entire Browns defensive line swarmed him, and it initially appeared that Rudd had sacked Green as time expired. However, Green had actually lateraled the ball to tackle John Tait while in the act of falling, just before he had hit the ground.  Not having seen this happen and believing that he had sacked Green to end the game, Rudd took off his helmet and threw it in the air in celebration of an apparent Browns victory.

In the meantime, Tait had run to the Browns' 26-yard line where he was knocked out of bounds. That would have been the end of the game, but Rudd was assessed to have committed an unsportsmanlike conduct penalty for his premature helmet toss.  Since football games, by rule, cannot end on a defensive penalty, the Chiefs got the chance to run one last untimed play.  The ball was moved to the 13-yard line (half the distance to the goal from the end of the run). Chiefs kicker Morten Andersen then booted a 30-yard field goal to win the game 40–39.

Rudd encountered a similar incident the next season in Tampa; as part of the Tampa Bay Buccaneers, he saw his teammate Simeon Rice draw an unsportsmanlike conduct penalty in a game against the Indianapolis Colts after a game-winning field goal attempt failed, giving the Colts another chance to win the game—being successful the second time.

Accomplishments 
Rudd holds the NFL record for most fumble return yards in a single season with 157, which he set in 1998. He also shares the NFL record (with many players) both for the most total fumble recoveries for touchdowns in a season and the most opponent fumble recoveries for touchdowns in a season, with two apiece.

References

External links 
Dwayne Rudd at NFL.com

1976 births
Living people
People from Batesville, Mississippi
Players of American football from Mississippi
American football linebackers
Alabama Crimson Tide football players
Minnesota Vikings players
Cleveland Browns players
Tampa Bay Buccaneers players